The Kirkland Performance Center is a 394-seat theater in downtown Kirkland, Washington.  It opened in June 1998.

Notable performances
 Philip Glass (2012)
 Judith Hill (2017)
 Rufus Wainwright (2018)

References

External links
 
 

Theatres in Washington (state)
Culture of Seattle
Culture of Kirkland, Washington
Buildings and structures in Kirkland, Washington
Tourist attractions in King County, Washington